DPI may refer to:

Organizations 
 Department of Public Information, related to U.N.
Daffodil Polytechnic Institute, an educational institution of Bangladesh
 Dhaka Polytechnic Institute, an educational institution of Bangladesh
 Disabled Peoples' International, an international non-governmental organization
 Discovery Partners Institute, an initiative of the University of Illinois
 New South Wales Department of Primary Industries (NSW DPI), an Australian governmental unit

Other 
 Daytona Prototype International, a class of car in sports car racing
 Deep packet inspection, a form of computer network packet filtering
 Defensive pass interference
 Digital program insertion
 Disposable personal income
 Dots per inch, a measure of printing, display or image resolution
 Mouse dots per inch, a measure of mouse speed
 Dry powder inhaler, a drug delivery device
 Dual polarisation interferometry
 Dye penetrant inspection, a nondestructive testing method
 SystemVerilog DPI (Direct Programming Interface)
 Data processing inequality
 Direct Power Injection is a method described by the standard IEC 62132-4 to measure the immunity of integrated circuits.

References